Johannes Cornelis van Hoolwerff (13 April 1878 in Hoorn – 2 August 1962 in Heemstede) was a sailor from the Netherlands, who represented his native country at the 1928 Summer Olympics in Amsterdam. Van Hoolwerff, as helmsman on the Dutch 8 Metre Hollandia, took the 2nd place with fellow crew members: Lambertus Doedes, Henk Kersken, Cornelis van Staveren, Gerard de Vries Lentsch and Maarten de Wit.

Sources
 
 
 

1878 births
1962 deaths
People from Hoorn
Dutch male sailors (sport)
Sailors at the 1928 Summer Olympics – 8 Metre
Olympic sailors of the Netherlands
Medalists at the 1928 Summer Olympics
Olympic medalists in sailing
Olympic silver medalists for the Netherlands
Sportspeople from North Holland
20th-century Dutch people